The Michener-Copernicus Fellowship is a literary award available to graduates of the Iowa Writers' Workshop. It is funded by the Copernicus Society of America. 

Past recipients include:
 Danielle Trussoni
 Anthony Swofford
 Peter Craig
 Emily Barton
 Rebecca Johns
 Brett Ellen Brock
 Justin Kramon
 Malena Watrous
 Andrew J. Porter
 Nam Le
 Kevin Gonzalez
 Drew Keenan
 Jonathan Blum
 Tony Tulathimutte
 Carmen Maria Machado
 Adam Soto
 Fatima Farheen Mirza

References

American literary awards